The canton of Pays de Briey is an administrative division of the Meurthe-et-Moselle department, northeastern France. It was created at the French canton reorganisation which came into effect in March 2015. Its seat is in Jœuf.

It consists of the following communes:

Abbéville-lès-Conflans
Affléville
Anderny
Anoux
Audun-le-Roman
Avillers
Avril
Les Baroches
Béchamps
Bettainvillers
Beuvillers
Domprix
Fléville-Lixières
Gondrecourt-Aix
Jœuf
Joppécourt
Joudreville
Landres
Lantéfontaine
Lubey
Mairy-Mainville
Malavillers
Mercy-le-Bas
Mercy-le-Haut
Mont-Bonvillers
Mouaville
Murville
Norroy-le-Sec
Ozerailles
Piennes
Preutin-Higny
Sancy
Thumeréville
Trieux
Tucquegnieux
Val de Briey
Xivry-Circourt

References

Cantons of Meurthe-et-Moselle